The 2012 Sony Ericsson Open (also known as 2012 Miami Masters), a men's and women's tennis tournament, was held from March 19 to April 1, 2012. It was the 28th edition of the Miami Masters event and played on outdoor hard courts at the Tennis Center at Crandon Park in Miami. The tournament was a part of 2012 ATP World Tour and 2012 WTA Tour, classified as ATP World Tour Masters 1000 and Premier Mandatory event respectively.

Points and prize money

Point distribution

Prize money
The total commitment prize money for this year's event was $4,828,050 each (WTA Tour and ATP World Tour).

Players

Men's singles

Seeds

 Rankings are as of March 19, 2012

Other entrants
The following players received wildcards into the main draw:
  Fernando González
  Ryan Harrison
  Denis Kudla
  Jesse Levine
  Marinko Matosevic

The following players received entry using a protected ranking into the main draw:
  Benjamin Becker
  Tommy Haas

The following players received entry from the qualifying draw:
  Roberto Bautista Agut
  Simone Bolelli
  Sergei Bubka
  Arnaud Clément
  Frank Dancevic
  Guillermo García López
  David Goffin
  Björn Phau
  Rajeev Ram
  Édouard Roger-Vasselin
  Guillaume Rufin
  Antonio Veić

The following player received entry as a lucky loser:
  Tobias Kamke

Withdrawals
  Juan Carlos Ferrero → replaced by  Matthew Ebden
  Fabio Fognini → replaced by  Benjamin Becker
  Ivan Ljubičić → replaced by  Grigor Dimitrov
  Rui Machado → replaced by  Steve Darcis
  Albert Montañés → replaced by  Flavio Cipolla
  Philipp Petzschner → replaced by  Tobias Kamke
  Robin Söderling (mononucleosis) → replaced by  Igor Kunitsyn
  Dmitry Tursunov → replaced by  David Nalbandian
  Filippo Volandri → replaced by  Sam Querrey
  Stanislas Wawrinka → replaced by  Nicolas Mahut
  Mikhail Youzhny → replaced by  Frederico Gil

Retirements
  Denis Istomin (illness)
  Yen-Hsun Lu (neck injury)
  Rafael Nadal (left knee injury)
  Milos Raonic (sprained right ankle)

Men's doubles

Seeds

 Rankings are as of March 19, 2012

Other entrants
The following pairs received wildcards into the doubles main draw:
  James Blake /  Ryan Harrison
  Paul Hanley /  Bernard Tomic

Retirements
  Milos Raonic (ankle injury)

Women's singles

Seeds

 Rankings are as of March 5, 2012

Other entrants
The following players received wildcards into the main draw:
  Bojana Jovanovski
  Alisa Kleybanova
  Garbiñe Muguruza Blanco
  Olivia Rogowska
  Heather Watson
  Venus Williams
  Aleksandra Wozniak
  Zhang Shuai

The following players received entry from the qualifying draw:
  Eva Birnerová
  Kateryna Bondarenko
  Alizé Cornet
  Melinda Czink
  Misaki Doi
  Vera Dushevina
  Stéphanie Foretz Gacon
  Jamie Hampton
  Madison Keys
  Urszula Radwańska
  Valeria Savinykh
  Sloane Stephens

Withdrawals
  Anna Chakvetadze → replaced by  Kimiko Date-Krumm
  Alexandra Dulgheru → replaced by  Michaëlla Krajicek
  Rebecca Marino → replaced by  Gréta Arn
  María José Martínez Sánchez → replaced by  Eleni Daniilidou
  Bethanie Mattek-Sands → replaced by  Lourdes Domínguez Lino
  Romina Oprandi → replaced by  Sílvia Soler Espinosa
  Andrea Petkovic → replaced by  Anna Tatishvili

Retirements
  Ayumi Morita (shoulder injury)
  Tamira Paszek (back injury)

Women's doubles

Seeds

 Rankings are as of March 5, 2012

Other entrants
The following pairs received wildcards into the doubles main draw:
  Dominika Cibulková /  Jelena Janković
  Gisela Dulko /  Paola Suárez
  Anna-Lena Grönefeld /  Petra Kvitová
  Anastasia Pavlyuchenkova /  Lucie Šafářová

Finals

Men's singles

 Novak Djokovic defeated   Andy Murray, 6–1, 7–6(7–4)
It was Djokovic's 2nd title of the year and 30th of his career. It was his 3rd win in Miami, also winning in 2007 and 2011. It was his 1st Masters of the year and 11th of his career.

Women's singles

 Agnieszka Radwańska defeated  Maria Sharapova, 7–5, 6–4
It was Radwańska's 2nd title of the year and 9th of her career. It was her 2nd Premier Mandatory-level tournament of her career and 5th Premier overall. At this point in the season, Radwańska only lost 4 times, which were all at the hands of No. 1 seed Victoria Azarenka. She was 26-0 versus all other opponents through the Sony Ericsson Open.

Men's doubles

 Leander Paes /  Radek Štěpánek defeated  Max Mirnyi /  Daniel Nestor 3–6, 6–1, [10–8]

Women's doubles

  Maria Kirilenko /  Nadia Petrova defeated  Sara Errani  /  Roberta Vinci, 7–6(7–0), 4–6, [10–4]

References

External links

 Official website

 
Sony Ericsson Open
Sony Ericsson Open
Sony Ericsson Open
Miami Open (tennis)
2012 in sports in Florida